Arethaea phantasma, known generally as the Rio Grande thread-leg katydid or Rio Grande catydid, is a species of phaneropterine katydid in the family Tettigoniidae. It is found in North America.

References

Phaneropterinae
Articles created by Qbugbot
Insects described in 1914